Abdul-Bari "Barry" Awad (born 3 March 1990), best known by his nickname of "Kid Galahad", is a British professional boxer who  held the IBF featherweight title in 2021. As of July 2022, Galahad is ranked as the world's ninth best featherweight by The Ring and tenth best by the Transnational Boxing Rankings Board. His ring name was chosen by trainer Brendan Ingle after a character played by Elvis Presley in the 1962 film of the same name. From 2014 to 2016, Galahad served a ban from boxing due to doping.

Early life
Galahad was born in the Qatar capital of Doha but is originally from Yemen. His father was in the Qatar Armed Forces and was released as part of an agreement with the Americans after the conclusion of the Gulf War. At the age of 4, Galahad came to England with his parents and lived in Liverpool until he was 12 years old and eventually ended up in Sheffield. At the age of thirteen he took up boxing with trainer Brendan Ingle.

Professional career
Galahad decided to take up boxing to keep him off the streets so he didn't follow his siblings and end up in jail and being involved in gang violence. After he started going to his local gym to get bigger he noticed a boxing ring, after shadow boxing for a few minutes he decided he wanted to be a boxer. After a chance meeting with his hero Prince Naseem Hamed he was told by Naseem that if he wanted to be great in boxing and wanted to be a champion he should train at the Brendan Ingle gym, so after driving around for an hour Galahad and his mother found the gym.

Galahad vs. Spencer 
Galahad made his professional debut on 5 September 2009 at the Colosseum in Watford England in which he defeated Delroy Spencer on Points.

Galahad vs. Senkovs 
Galahad's Second Professional fight took place on 3 October 2009 at the Leisure Centre in Altrincham England where he defeated Pavels Senkovs on Points after 4 rounds.

Galahad vs. Curran 
He then scored his first stoppage Victory on 21 May 2010 defeating Dougie Curran by TKO in the second round.

Galahad vs. Booth 
Galahad racked up a record of 10–0 before defeating Jason Booth by Unanimous Decision on 18 February 2012 to earn his first title the WBC International super-bantamweight championship

Galahad vs. Wale 
Galahad defended his championship once against Josh Wale by TKO afterwards he vacated the title.

Galahad scored two more wins, defeating Ivan Ruiz Morote and Isaac Nettey both by TKO to earn a shot at the BBBofC British title which he won by defeating James Dickens by TKO, he would later vacate the title.

Galahad vs. Prado 
On 22 March 2014, Galahad won the European super-bantamweight championship with a unanimous twelve round decision over Sergio Prado.

Galahad vs. Mundraby 
On 10 May 2014, Galahad won the vacant Commonwealth super-bantamweight championship by beating Fred Mundraby by corner retirement after round 4.

Galahad vs. Dos Santos 
Galahad faced Adeilson Dos Santos on 20 September 2014 at the Ponds Forge Arena for the vacant IBF World Youth super-bantamweight championship. Gallahad controlled the fight, out boxing Dos Santos with fast jabs, hooks and combinations sending Dos Santos to the canvas in the first round and tenth round. Gallahad won the fight by unanimous decision.

In October 2014 Galahad vacated the European title to pursue a world title.

Doping ban 
In May 2015, Galahad was banned for 2 years following a failed drugs test. He tested positive for banned substance stanozolol, an anabolic steroid. He maintains his innocence saying his brother put the steroids in his protein shake after Galahad refused to give him money, and appealed against a ban, but it was rejected by UKAD and the ban upheld, backdated to run from 20 September 2014.

Galahad vs. Volosinas 
Galahad made his return to boxing on 30 April 2016 with a 4th round TKO win over Simas Volosinas at the DW Stadium in Wigan, England. This was Galahad’s first non championship fight since 2013.

Galahad won his first title since his return on 15 July 2017 winning the vacant IBF Inter-Continental featherweight title.

Galahad vs. Warrington 
On Saturday 15 June 2019 Galahad narrowly lost a split decision to Josh Warrington fighting for the IBF featherweight Title in what many commentators saw as a difficult contest to score. Judge Howard Foster's card was 115-113 in favour of Galahad, Steve Gray was 116-112 for Warrington and Michael Alexander was 116-113 for Warrington. Writing in The Observer, Tom Seymour noted that "the fight was perilously close ... Kid Galahad has a right to feel he was robbed of the chance to be the IBF's undisputed champion".

Galahad vs. Marrero 
Galahad beat Claudio Marrero by technical knockout in the 8th round on 8th February 2020 at Sheffield Arena in Sheffield.

Galahad vs. Dickens 
On 7 August 2021, Galahad successfully captured his first world title, the vacant IBF featherweight title against Jazza Dickens. Dickens was ranked #3 by the IBF at featherweight at the time. The fight was stopped at the end of the 11th round when Dickens' corner refused to continue due to the punishment that he was taking.

Galahad vs. Martinez 
On 13 November 2021, Galahad lost his world title in his first defence against Kiko Martinez, who was ranked #15 by the IBF at featherweight. Galahad looked comfortable through the first 5 rounds before being floored in the last 30 seconds of round 5. Galahad was again floored with the first punch of the 6th round and the referee stopped the fight.

Professional boxing record

References

External links

Kid Galahad - Profile, News Archive & Current Rankings at Box.Live

1990 births
Living people
British sportspeople in doping cases
Doping cases in boxing
Super-bantamweight boxers
British male boxers
European Boxing Union champions
Commonwealth Boxing Council champions
Featherweight boxers
British Boxing Board of Control champions